Triple accreditation in management education, also known as triple crown accreditation, describes a business school accredited by three major accreditation bodies: The Association to Advance Collegiate Schools of Business (AACSB), the Association of MBAs (AMBA), and EFMD Quality Improvement System (EQUIS). About 1% of business schools are triple-accredited.

Accreditation comparison 
Each of the three institutions assesses a business school according to different criteria and scope. The AMBA accreditation certifies the overall quality of the Master in Business Administration programme MBA, including faculty and facilities. The accreditation assures students that the business school adheres to high quality standards. AACSB and EQUIS include quality benchmarks for the school.

Schools by country
In May 2020, there were 100 triple-accredited business schools in 36 countries or regions:. This number has grown to over 110 by November 2021.

Argentina 
 IAE Universidad Austral, Buenos Aires

Australia 
 QUT Business School, Queensland University of Technology
 Monash University
 University of Sydney Business School

Austria 
 Vienna University of Economics and Business, Vienna

Belgium 
 Vlerick Business School, Ghent

Brazil 
 EAESP - Fundação Getúlio Vargas, São Paulo
 Insper, São Paulo

Canada 
 HEC Montreal, Montreal
 Telfer School of Management, University of Ottawa, Ottawa

Chile 
 Adolfo Ibáñez University, Santiago

China 
 Antai College of Economics and Management, Shanghai Jiao Tong University
 Beijing Institute of Technology
 Lingnan College, Sun Yat-sen University
 Sun Yat-sen Business School, Sun Yat-sen University
 School of Economics and Management, Tongji University
 University of International Business and Economics
 Zhejiang University
 Xiamen University
 International Business School Suzhou, Xi'an Jiaotong Liverpool University
Wuhan University School of Economics and Management
 University of Macau

Colombia 
 Universidad de los Andes, Facultad de Administración, Bogota

Costa Rica 
 INCAE Business School, Alajuela

Czech Republic 
 Prague University of Economics and Business, Prague

Denmark 
 Copenhagen Business School, Copenhagen
 Aarhus University BSS, Aarhus

Egypt 
 American University in Cairo, Cairo.

Finland 
 Aalto University School of Business, Helsinki
 Hanken School of Economics, Helsinki and Vaasa

France 
 Audencia Nantes
 Burgundy School of Business
 EDHEC (École des hautes études commerciales du nord)
 EM Normandie Business School 
 Emlyon Business School
 ESC Clermont Business School
 ESC Rennes School of Business
 ESSCA School of Management
 ESSEC Business School
 Grenoble School of Management
 HEC Paris (Ecole des Hautes Etudes Commerciales)
 ICN Business School
 IÉSEG School of Management
 INSEAD (Institut Européen d'Administration des Affaires)
 KEDGE Business School
 La Rochelle Business School
 Montpellier Business School
 NEOMA Business School
 Toulouse Business School
 EM Strasbourg Business School

Germany 
 European School of Management and Technology
 Frankfurt School of Finance & Management
 Mannheim Business School
 TUM School of Management

Hong Kong 
 School of Business, Hong Kong Baptist University

India 
 Indian Institute of Management Calcutta
 Indian Institute of Management Indore
 Indian School of Business

Ireland 
 Trinity College Dublin, Trinity Business School
 University College Dublin, Michael Smurfit Graduate School of Business/UCD Quinn School of Business
 University of Limerick, Kemmy Business School

Italy 
 SDA Bocconi School of Management, Milan
 MIP Politecnico di Milano, Milan

Japan 
 NUCB Business School

Macau 
 Faculty of Business Administration, University of Macau

Mexico 
 EGADE Business School, Tecnológico de Monterrey, Monterrey, Guadalajara and Mexico City.
 Instituto Tecnológico Autónomo de México, Mexico City.
 IPADE Business School, Universidad Panamericana, Monterrey, Guadalajara and Mexico City.

Netherlands 
 Maastricht University School of Business and Economics
 Rotterdam School of Management, Erasmus University Rotterdam
 Amsterdam Business School, University of Amsterdam

New Zealand 
 University of Auckland Business School
 University of Waikato Faculty of Management, Hamilton
 Victoria University of Wellington, Victoria Business School, Wellington
 University of Canterbury Business School

Nicaragua 
 INCAE Business School

Norway 
 BI Norwegian Business School
 Norwegian School of Economics

Peru 
 Pontificia Universidad Católica del Perú - CENTRUM

Poland 
 University of Warsaw, Faculty of Management,  Warsaw
 Kozminski University, Warsaw

Portugal 
 Católica Lisbon School of Business & Economics
 Nova School of Business and Economics
 Católica Porto Business School
 Porto Business School

Russia 
 Graduate School of Management, St Petersburg University, St Petersburg

Singapore 
 Lee Kong Chian School of Business (Singapore Management University)
 INSEAD

Slovenia 
 SEB LU - School of Economics and Business

South Africa 
 University of Cape Town Graduate School of Business, Cape Town
 University of Stellenbosch Business School, Cape Town
 University of Pretoria, Gordon Institute of Business Science, Johannesburg

South Korea 
 Korea University Business School, Seoul
  Yonsei School of Business, Seoul

Spain 
 ESADE Business School and ESADE University Faculties, Barcelona
 IE Business School, Madrid
 IESE Barcelona

Sweden 
 School of Business, Economics and Law, Gothenburg 
 Lund School of Economics and Management, Lund

Switzerland 
 IMD Lausanne
 University of St. Gallen

Thailand 
 Thammasat Business School, Thammasat University

Turkey 
 Koç University

United Kingdom 
 Adam Smith Business School, University of Glasgow
 Alliance Manchester Business School, University of Manchester
 Aston Business School, Aston University
 Bayes Business School, City, University of London
 Birmingham Business School, University of Birmingham
 Bradford University School of Management, University of Bradford
 Cranfield School of Management, Cranfield University
 Durham University Business School, Durham University
 Henley Business School, University of Reading
 Imperial College Business School
 Kent Business School, University of Kent
 Lancaster University Management School, Lancaster University
 Leeds University Business School, University of Leeds
 London Business School
 Loughborough University School of Business and Economics
 Manchester Metropolitan University Business School
 Newcastle University Business School
 Nottingham University Business School
 Open University Business School
 Sheffield University Management School, University of Sheffield
 Strathclyde Business School, University of Strathclyde
 University of Edinburgh Business School, University of Edinburgh
 University of Exeter Business School, University of Exeter
 University of Liverpool Management School
 Warwick Business School, University of Warwick

United States 
 Hult International Business School, Boston, San Francisco, London, Shanghai, and Dubai
 Miami Herbert Business School, University of Miami
 Olin Business School, Washington University in St. Louis

Venezuela 
 Instituto de Estudios Superiores de Administración

Institutions that have lost Triple Accreditation 
Six business schools have previously held Triple Accreditation status but are no longer triple-accredited:

 City University of Hong Kong (Hong Kong)
 ESCP Business School (France)
 Hong Kong Polytechnic University (Hong Kong)
 Queen's University at Kingston (Canada)
 Skema Business School (France)
 University of Hull (United Kingdom)

See also 
 List of AACSB-accredited institutions
 List of AMBA-accredited institutions
 List of EQUIS accredited institutions

References 

Business schools